Ivo Charles Graham (born 5 September 1990) is an English stand-up comedian and comedy writer.

Biography 
Born in Tokyo, Graham attended day and boarding schools in Australia and the UK, including Eton College, as his family moved around for his father's work. He studied French and Russian literature at University College, Oxford, graduating in 2012.

Comedy career 
He was the youngest ever winner of So You Think You're Funny in 2009 and was subsequently signed by the biggest stand up talent agency in the UK, Off The Kerb. He was nominated for Best Newcomer at the 2010 Chortle Awards. In 2019 he was nominated at Edinburgh Festival for the Dave Edinburgh Comedy Awards for Best Show for his show entitled The Game Of Life.

His television appearances include The Stand Up Sketch Show (ITV2), Live at the Apollo, Mock the Week, Live from the BBC, Russell Howard's Stand Up Central, As Yet Untitled, Virtually Famous, Qi, Sweat the Small Stuff and The Dog Ate My Homework and he is a regular on radio show Fighting Talk. In October 2019 and December 2021, he competed on Richard Osman's House of Games and appeared on Paul Merton's team on Have I Got News For You on 8 November 2019. Ivo appeared again on the show, via webcam (due to the Covid-19 lockdown), on 15 May 2020, and was again part of Paul Merton's team.

Graham regularly performs at the Edinburgh Fringe. His shows Binoculars (2013), Bowties and Johnnies (2014) and No Filter (2015) all transferred to London for runs at the Soho Theatre. His 2017 show Educated Guess garnered good reviews and sold out, prompting several extra shows to be added, and were performed at the Soho Theatre in October. Graham has also supported Josh Widdicombe on tour.

In 2019 Graham was included in the i-news "50 of the best jokes of the Edinburgh Fringe" with his line: "Do I enjoy randomly appointing people to judicial positions? I'll let you be the judge of that."

In late 2021, Graham co-presented the Dave travelogue British as Folk alongside fellow comedians Darren Harriott and Fern Brady.

In December 2022, it was announced that Graham would appear on the fifteenth season of Taskmaster alongside Frankie Boyle, Mae Martin, Kiell Smith-Bynoe and Jenny Eclair.

Personal life
He is a supporter of Swindon Town F.C. He has a daughter, born in February 2019. He commented on the Josh Widdicombe and Rob Beckett Parenting lockdown podcast that the relationship with his daughter's mother broke down in January 2020.

References

External links

1990 births
Living people
21st-century English comedians
Alumni of University College, Oxford
English male comedians
English stand-up comedians
People educated at Eton College
People from Tokyo